Timothy Sherwin (born May 4, 1958) is a former American football tight end who played professionally in the National Football League (NFL) for seven seasons for the Baltimore/Indianapolis Colts. He played college football at Boston College and was drafted in the fourth round of the 1981 NFL Draft.

References

1958 births
Living people
American football tight ends
Baltimore Colts players
Boston College Eagles football players
Indianapolis Colts players
New York Giants players
Sportspeople from Troy, New York
Players of American football from New York (state)